In Greek mythology, Polyctor (Ancient Greek: Πολύκτωρ) may refer to the following figures:

 Polyctor, an Egyptian prince as one of the sons of King Aegyptus. His mother was the naiad Caliadne and thus full brother of Eurylochus, Phantes, Peristhenes, Hermus, Potamon, Dryas, Lixus, Imbrus, Bromius, Cisseus and Chthonius. In some accounts, he could be a son of Aegyptus either by Eurryroe, daughter of the river-god Nilus, or Isaie, daughter of King Agenor of Tyre. Polyctor suffered the same fate as his other brothers, save Lynceus, when they were slain on their wedding night by their wives who obeyed the command of their father King Danaus of Libya. He married the Danaid Stygne, daughter of Danaus and the naiad Polyxo.
 Polyctor, remembered for having made a basin of stone into which a spring ran, in Ithaca, together with Ithacus and Neritus. He had a son Pisander, who was one of the suitors of Penelope.
 In Homer's Iliad, Hermes takes the guise of a young mortal man when he is sent to keep Priam safe during his embassy to Achilles, and claims to be the son of a certain Polyctor.

Notes

References 
 Apollodorus, The Library with an English Translation by Sir James George Frazer, F.B.A., F.R.S. in 2 Volumes, Cambridge, MA, Harvard University Press; London, William Heinemann Ltd. 1921. ISBN 0-674-99135-4. Online version at the Perseus Digital Library. Greek text available from the same website.
Homer, The Iliad with an English Translation by A.T. Murray, Ph.D. in two volumes. Cambridge, MA., Harvard University Press; London, William Heinemann, Ltd. 1924. . Online version at the Perseus Digital Library.
Homer, Homeri Opera in five volumes. Oxford, Oxford University Press. 1920. . Greek text available at the Perseus Digital Library.
Homer, The Odyssey with an English Translation by A.T. Murray, Ph.D. in two volumes. Cambridge, MA., Harvard University Press; London, William Heinemann, Ltd. 1919. . Online version at the Perseus Digital Library. Greek text available from the same website.

Princes in Greek mythology
Sons of Aegyptus
Characters in the Odyssey